North Kingstown is a town in Washington County, Rhode Island, United States, and is part of the Providence metropolitan area. The population was 27,732 in the 2020 census. North Kingstown is home to the birthplace of American portraitist Gilbert Stuart, who was born in the village of Saunderstown.  Within the town is Quonset Point, location of the former Naval Air Station Quonset Point, known for the invention of the Quonset hut, as well as the historic village of Wickford.

History

The area was first settled by Roger Williams and Richard Smith who set up trading posts near Wickford where Smith's Castle is today. The town of Kings Towne was founded in 1674, by the colonial government, and included the present day towns of North Kingstown, South Kingstown, Exeter, and Narragansett.  In 1723, Kings Towne was split into two parts, North Kingstown and South Kingstown, with North Kingstown, having the earliest settlements, retaining the 1674 establishment date.  In 1742, the town of Exeter was taken from the western part of North Kingstown.

Geography

Demographics

As of the 2010 census, there were 26,486 people, 10,436 households, and 7,347 families residing in the town.  The racial makeup of the town was 94.7% White, 1.0% African American, 0.6% American Indian/Alaska Native, 1.3% Asian, 0.5% from some other race other races, and 1.9% from two or more races. Hispanic or Latino of any race were 2.4% of the population.

Of the 10,436 households, 70.4% were families, 31.2% had children under the age of 18 living with them, and 29.6% were non-families. 24.2% of all households were made up of householders living alone.  The average household size was 2.52 and the average family size was 3.02.  75.4% of households resided in owner-occupied units and 24.6% in rental units.

According to the 2017 American Community Survey, the median income for a household in the town was $87,311 (adjusted to inflation), the median income for a family was $105,954, and the median income for married-couple families was $120,103.

Transportation
Wickford Junction is a terminus station on the Providence/Stoughton Line of the MBTA Commuter Rail, providing weekday train service to Providence Station and Boston's South Station.

RIPTA also services in the town inbound to Providence and outbound to Narragansett or Newport.

North Kingstown is also served by a passenger ferry connecting to the island of Martha's Vineyard.

Education
North Kingstown School Department is the municipal school district. It operates North Kingstown High School.

Notable people

 Elizabeth Beisel, two-time Olympic medalist swimmer
 John Cole (1715–1777), was a lawyer and 12th Chief Justice of the Rhode Island Supreme Court
 Captain Daniel Fones
 Gilbert Stuart (1755–1828), painter; his portrait of George Washington appears on the one dollar bill
 Dee Dee Myers (born 1961), 19th White House Press Secretary

Points of interest
 Casey Farm (1725): An original colonial plantation that is today one of the oldest operational farms in New England.
 Davis Memorial Wildlife Refuge: 96 acres of forest and wetlands preserved by the Audubon Society of Rhode Island.
 Devil's Foot Rock: A footprint-like natural impression or possibly petrosomatoglyph. Legends going back to the colonial era tell of a Native American woman being chased by the devil. Some say that she fled from Boston. Her pursuer is said to have left his footprints at Devil's Foot Rock, then at Chimney Hill in South Kingstown, and finally at Block Island.
 Gilbert Stuart Birthplace and Museum (1751): The house in which American portraitist Gilbert Stuart was born in 1755. The museum features works from throughout Stuart's career and operational grist and snuff mills.
 Historic Wickford Village: A historic seaside village which contains one of the largest collections of preserved 18th-century houses in the Northeastern United States. Wickford also has a large and scenic harbor.
 David S. Baker Estate: Home of Rhode Island's first elected Governor to never be seated. 
 Quonset Air Museum: A large museum located at the former Naval Air Station Quonset Point which focuses on military aviation history.
 Smith's Castle (1678): A colonial plantation located on the shore of Narragansett Bay.
 Quonset Point, a former military base which was once the home of the Naval Construction Battalions known as the Seabees

Other National Historic Places in North Kingstown

 Allen-Madison House (1801)
 Camp Endicott (1942)
 Crowfield Historic District
 Davisville Historic District
 George Douglas House (1738)
 George Fayerweather Blacksmith Shop (1819)
 Ezekial Gardner House
 Hamilton Mill Village Historic District
 Lafayette Village
 Stephen Northup House (1712)
 Old Narragansett Cemetery
 Old Narragansett Church (1707)
 Palmer-Northrup House (1680)
 Joseph Pierce Farm
 Plum Beach Light (1899)
 Poplar Point Light (1831)
 Rathbun House
 Esbon Sanford House (1832)
 Saunderstown Historic District
 Six Principle Baptist Church (1703)
 Joseph Slocum House (1750)
 Spink Farm (1798)
 St. Paul's Church (1847)
 YWCA Site

See also 
 North Kingstown School District

References

External links

 Town of North Kingstown website

 
Towns in Washington County, Rhode Island
Narragansett Bay
Populated coastal places in Rhode Island
Providence metropolitan area
Towns in Rhode Island